Haji Marsal Bin Maun (8 November 1913 – 28 March 2000) was the second Menteri Besar (Chief Minister of Brunei), who served from 1961 to 1962. It was during his tenure as Menteri Besar that the Brunei Revolt broke out.

Marsal Maun was one of the person responsible for the establishment of the Federation of Brunei Malay Teachers (PGGMB) and Brunei Scout Movement, which both still run till today.

Early life and education
Marsal Maun was born on 8 November 1913 at Kampong Pulau Ambok (currently known as Kampong Pintu Malim). Marsal Maun had his early education at the Malay School in Jalan Pemancha. After passing primary four, Marsal was appointed as a probationary teacher, and in 1930 he attended a teacher training course at the Sultan Idris Training College (SITC), Tanjung Malim, British Malaya, where he qualified as a teacher in 1933.

Career

Political Involvement 
Upon his return from the United Kingdom, Marsal was appointed assistant teacher, and in 1934, he was made acting superintendent of education. He later became a founding member of the Persekutuan Guru-Guru Melayu Brunei (Federation of Brunei Malay Teachers) during the period before the Second World War. It was through this association that he became a close confidante of Sultan Omar Ali Saifuddien III.

Brunei Scout Movement 
In January 1933, while working as a teacher at Sekolah Melayu Jalan Pemancha, Pekan (Jalan Pemancha Malay School), Marsal formed a Scout troop with 12 boys. Chegu Awang Zaidi bin awang Taha, headmaster of the school, who was also the head of the Education Department became the Scoutmaster while Marsal serve as the Assistant Scoutmaster.

Constitution 1959 
Marsal was one of the people who was responsible for advising Sultan Omar Ali Saifuddien III in drafting the Written Constitution for Brunei. He was also one of the members of the Constitutional delegation, representing Brunei, during constitutional talks in London.

Menteri Besar 
On 1 May 1960, Marsal was appointed as the Deputy State Secretary of Brunei and on 1 August 1961, Marsal became Brunei's Chief Minister, a post he held until 1 September 1962.

Rebellion 1962 
On 8 December 1962, less than 3 months after Marsal left office, the Brunei Revolt broke out. Although he had lost the favour of the Sultan, he eventually advised the Sultan on how to dealt with the rebellion. It was he who advised the Sultan to request military assistance from Great Britain in accordance with the Treaty of Protection of 1888.

Later life and death
After his retirement, Marsal continued to be active as an elder statesman. He continued to give advice to more junior ministers who regarded him as mentor. Marsal Maun died on 28 March 2000.

Personal life
Marsal Maun was married to Datin Zubaidah Othman and blessed with four children.

Legacy

Namesakes 
Several places were named after him, including:
 A road named Jalan Dato Marsal, situated near Sultan Muhammad Jamalul Alam Secondary School in Jalan Mabohai, Bandar Seri Begawan.
 Dato Marsal Primary School (SRDM) is a primary school in Lambak Kanan, Bandar Seri Begawan.

Awards 
 1991 Teacher's Day Award.

Honours 
Marsal Maun was posthumously granted the soubriquet Bapa Perlembagaan (Father of the Constitution). Notably, he was also awarded;

   Order of Seri Paduka Mahkota Brunei First Class (SPMB) – Dato Seri Paduka
  Order of Setia Negara Brunei (DSNB) – Dato Setia
  Omar Ali Saifuddin Medal (POAS)

References

1913 births
2000 deaths
Government ministers of Brunei
Bruneian Muslims
Bruneian politicians
Chief Ministers of Brunei
Sultan Idris Education University alumni